The 1914–15 Bradford City A.F.C. season was the 12th in the club's history.

The club finished 10th in Division One, and reached the 4th round of the FA Cup. Prior to the start of the season the club undertook a 10 match tour of continental Europe, the third such tour in their history, winning 9 games.

Sources

References

Bradford City A.F.C. seasons
Bradford City